Piter De Vries is a fictional character from the Dune universe created by Frank Herbert. He is primarily featured in the 1965 novel Dune, but also appears in the Prelude to Dune prequel trilogy (1999–2001) by Brian Herbert and Kevin J. Anderson.

De Vries is portrayed by Brad Dourif in David Lynch's 1984 film Dune, by Jan Unger in the 2000 Dune miniseries, and by David Dastmalchian in the 2021 Denis Villeneuve film Dune.

Character 
In the service of the ruthless Baron Vladimir Harkonnen, De Vries is a Mentat—a human specially trained to perform mental functions rivaling computers, which are forbidden universe-wide, after the Butlerian Jihad. In addition, De Vries has been "twisted" into an amoral sadist by the Tleilaxu.

When De Vries is introduced in the novel, he is first described as "a slender, short man with effeminate face", and when Jessica meets him for the first time, he is described as "tall, though slender, and something about him suggested effeminacy". De Vries is described in the novel Dune (though not portrayed on screen) as being addicted to the drug melange, which colors both the sclera and irises of users a deep blue. He also has the ruby red lips characteristic of sapho-drinkers.

De Vries is so loyal to Harkonnen that he continues to serve the Baron with great enthusiasm even though his Mentat abilities and great intelligence confirm his suspicions that his master plans to eventually kill him. As he says in Dune:

Appearances

Dune
In Dune, it is established that De Vries had pioneered a type of toxin called "residual poison" which remains in the body for years and requires an antidote to be administered regularly. One such fatal poison is secretly administered by the Harkonnens to Thufir Hawat, the Mentat of House Atreides, in order to guarantee Hawat's allegiance to the Harkonnens, who alone possess the antidote. De Vries is the architect of the plan to destroy House Atreides, longtime enemy of the Harkonnens, while restoring the Baron's stewardship over the planet Arrakis. Dr. Wellington Yueh, personal physician to House Atreides, has undergone Suk conditioning, which renders him incapable of inflicting harm on his patients. De Vries breaks this conditioning through torture and psychological manipulation, and Yueh eventually betrays House Atreides. De Vries originally plans to claim Lady Jessica, the concubine of Duke Leto Atreides, as his slave, but accepts an offer to become governor of Arrakis instead. However, Yueh has given the captured Leto a false tooth filled with poison gas. When Leto crushes the tooth, the intended victim Baron Harkonnen escapes, but Leto and De Vries die.

Prelude to Dune
In Dune: House Corrino (published in 2001 and the third novel in the Prelude to Dune prequel series by Brian Herbert and Kevin J. Anderson), Piter De Vries discovers the Harkonnen heritage of Lady Jessica and her newborn son Paul, and attempts to kidnap and ransom the infant. The plot is thwarted and the secret preserved—the Reverend Mother Gaius Helen Mohiam kills the Mentat and arranges for his corpse to be shipped home to Giedi Prime. An enraged Baron is left with no choice but to order a duplicate from the Bene Tleilax: the Mentat De Vries featured in Herbert's original novel Dune.

In adaptations
De Vries is portrayed by Brad Dourif in David Lynch's 1984 film Dune, Jan Unger in the 2000 Dune miniseries, and David Dastmalchian in Denis Villeneuve's 2021 film Dune.

References

External links 
 Piter De Vries on IMDb

Dune (franchise) characters
Fictional henchmen
Fictional murderers
Literary characters introduced in 1965
Fictional drug addicts
Male characters in literature
Male literary villains
Fictional characters who have mental powers